Grayling or Greyling may refer to:

Animals

Fish
 Grayling, generically, any fish of the genus Thymallus in the family Salmonidae
 European grayling (Thymallus thymallus), the European species of the genus Thymallus
 Arctic grayling (Thymallus arcticus)
 Australian grayling (Prototroctes maraena), a fish in the family Retropinnidae
 New Zealand grayling (Prototroctes oxyrhynchus), a recently extinct fish of New Zealand

Butterflies
 Grayling, many of the butterflies in the genus Hipparchia and Oeneis
 Grayling (butterfly) (Hipparchia semele)
 Common wood-nymph or grayling (Cercyonis pegala)

Places

United States
 Grayling, Alaska
 Grayling, Michigan
 Grayling Charter Township, Michigan
 Camp Grayling, National Guard training facility near Grayling, Michigan

People
 A. C. Grayling (born 1949), British philosopher
 Chris Grayling (born 1962), British politician
 Eduard Greyling (born 1948), South African ballet dancer

Other uses
 Grayling (PR firm), a public relations firm
 USS Grayling, several US Navy ships and submarines
 Dr Grayling Russell, a fictional character in the Inspector Morse TV series

Animal common name disambiguation pages